Ferenc Pataki (18 September 1917 – 25 April 1988) was a Hungarian gymnast and Olympic champion.

He competed at the 1948 Summer Olympics in London where he received a gold medal in floor exercise, and bronze medals in vault and team combined exercises.

References

External links

1917 births
1988 deaths
Hungarian male artistic gymnasts
Gymnasts at the 1948 Summer Olympics
Gymnasts at the 1952 Summer Olympics
Olympic gymnasts of Hungary
Olympic gold medalists for Hungary
Olympic bronze medalists for Hungary
Olympic medalists in gymnastics
Medalists at the 1948 Summer Olympics
Gymnasts from Budapest
20th-century Hungarian people